Michael Ross Mohler (born July 26, 1968) is an American former professional baseball player. A pitcher, Mohler played for the Oakland Athletics, St. Louis Cardinals, Cleveland Indians, and Arizona Diamondbacks of Major League Baseball (MLB) from 1993 to 2001. He attended East Ascension High School and Nicholls State University, playing on both baseball teams.

External links

1968 births
Living people
American expatriate baseball players in Canada
Arizona Diamondbacks players
Baseball players from Dayton, Ohio
Buffalo Bisons (minor league) players
Cleveland Indians players
Edmonton Trappers players
Huntsville Stars players
Madison Muskies players
Major League Baseball pitchers
Memphis Redbirds players
Modesto A's players
Nicholls Colonels baseball players
Oakland Athletics players
Ottawa Lynx players
Rochester Red Wings players
Sacramento River Cats players
St. Louis Cardinals players
Tacoma Tigers players
Tucson Sidewinders players